Blacklist is a 2003 novel by crime writer Sara Paretsky. It features Private Investigator V. I. Warshawski, and was awarded the 2004 Crime Writers' Association Gold Dagger.

Plot
Chicago private detective V.I. Warshawski is asked by a longtime client to look into his mother's suspicion that trespassers are living in the empty mansion her father built.  V.I. discovers a corpse on the property that is found to be a young black journalist who was writing about members of a 1930s federal theater project and one member in particular who was blacklisted during the Communist witch hunt. V.I. is hired by the journalist's sister to investigate his death.

References

2003 American novels
American crime novels
Novels set in Chicago
English-language novels
Novels by Sarah Paretsky